Muscatine County is a county located in the U.S. state of Iowa. As of the 2020 census, the population was 43,235. The county seat is Muscatine. The southeastern border is formed by the Mississippi River.

Muscatine County comprises the Muscatine, IA Micropolitan Statistical Area, which is included in the Davenport-Moline, IA-IL Combined Statistical Area.

History
Muscatine County was formed in December 1836 as a part of Wisconsin Territory, partitioned from Des Moines County, which had been organized two years previously. One history suggests that the county was named for Muscatine Island in the Mississippi River. The island lies opposite Muscatine County and was believed to be named after the Mascouten tribe, Algonquian-speaking Native Americans who lived in the area before being driven west by settler encroachment and other tribes.

Colonel George Davenport of Illinois sent three representatives into the territory in 1833 to establish a trade post. They were the first European Americans to settle there. In the same year, James W. Casey and John Vanatta came to the area. They opened a supply depot for steamboats on June 1, 1833, and named it Casey's Woodpile (since steamboats used wood as fuel). Muscatine County became part of Iowa Territory on July 4, 1838, when it was established by partitioning the area from Wisconsin Territory. The first public land sale was held in November 1838. One year later, officials began construction of the first courthouse and associated jail. A second jail, known as the "Old Jail", was built in 1857.

The first courthouse was destroyed by fire on December 23, 1864. By 1866 a replacement stood on the same site. The present courthouse opened on September 26, 1907.

Geography

Adjacent counties
Cedar County (north)
Johnson County (northwest)
Louisa County (south, southwest)
Rock Island County, Illinois (east), across the Mississippi River
Scott County (northeast)

Transportation

Transit
 List of intercity bus stops in Iowa

Major highways
 U.S. Highway 6 – enters from Cedar County, west of Wilton, runs south two miles, then continues west and west-northwest to the northwest corner of the county, exiting into Johnson County.
 U.S. Highway 61 – enters from Louisa County, southwest of Fruitland. Runs northeast through the county, passing Muscatine, before turning east to enter Scott County at Blue Grass.
 Iowa Highway 22 – begins at an intersection with Iowa 70, three miles east of Nichols. Runs east and southeast to an intersection with US 61, west of Muscatine.
 Iowa Highway 38 – begins at an intersection with US 6, three miles south of Wilton. Runs south to an intersection with US 61, north of Muscatine.
 Iowa Highway 70 – enters from Louisa County at the southwest corner of Muscatine County. Runs north, northeast and east to Cedar County, passing Nichols and West Liberty.
 Iowa Highway 92 - enters Muscatine County (and state of Iowa), running northwest across the historic Norbert F. Beckey Bridge into central Muscatine. Runs southwest along the Mississippi River to intersection with US 61, southwest of Muscatine.

Other roadway designations
Great River Road - system of roadways marking north–south routes across the conterminous US, and generally passing through Iowa.

County highways

County Highway F58 (formerly Hwy 927)
County Highway F62
County Highway F65
County Highway F70 (155th St)
County Highway G14 (180th St)
County Highway G28 (230th/231st Sts)
County Highway G34 (275th St)
County Highway G38 (Fruitland Rd)
County Highway X34 (Davis Ave)
County Highway X40 (Garfield Ave)
County Highway X46 (Kelly Ave/170th St)
County Highway X61 (Stewart Rd)
County Highway Y14 (Taylor Ave)
County Highway Y26 (Vail Ave)
County Highway Y30 (Western Ave)
County Highway Y36 (Zachary Ave)

Demographics

2020 census
There were 18,366 housing units, of which 16,908 were occupied.

2010 census
There were 17,910 housing units, of which 16,412 were occupied.

2000 census

As of the census of 2000, there were 41,722 people, 15,847 households, and 11,283 families residing in the county. There were 16,786 housing units at an average density of 38 per square mile (15/km2). The racial makeup of the county was 90.72% White, 0.70% Black or African American, 0.31% Native American, 0.83% Asian, 0.02% Pacific Islander, 6.05% from other races, and 1.37% from two or more races. 11.92% of the population were Hispanic or Latino of any race.

There were 15,847 households, out of which 34.80% had children under the age of 18 living with them, 57.90% were married couples living together, 9.30% had a female householder with no husband present, and 28.80% were non-families. 24.10% of all households were made up of individuals, and 9.90% had someone living alone who was 65 years of age or older. The average household size was 2.59 and the average family size was 3.07.

In the county, the population was spread out, with 26.90% under the age of 18, 8.60% from 18 to 24, 28.80% from 25 to 44, 22.80% from 45 to 64, and 12.90% who were 65 years of age or older. The median age was 36 years. For every 100 females, there were 98.10 males. For every 100 females age 18 and over, there were 94.90 males.

The median income for a household in the county was $41,803, and the median income for a family was $48,373. Males had a median income of $36,329 versus $24,793 for females. The per capita income for the county was $19,625. About 6.30% of families and 8.90% of the population were below the poverty line, including 10.70% of those under age 18 and 7.70% of those age 65 or over.

Communities

Cities

Atalissa
Blue Grass (part)
Conesville
Durant (part)
Fruitland
Muscatine
Nichols
Stockton
Walcott (part)
West Liberty
Wilton

Census-designated places

Fairport
Kent Estates
Montpelier
Moscow

Other unincorporated communities

Ardon
Cranston
Hinkeyville
Midway Beach
Petersburg
Port Allen

Townships

 Bloomington
 Cedar
 Fruitland
 Fulton
 Goshen
 Lake
 Montpelier
 Moscow
 Orono
 Pike
 Seventy-Six
 Sweetland
 Wapsinonoc
 Wilton

Population ranking
The population ranking of the table is based on the 2020 census of Muscatine County.

† county seat

Politics

See also

National Register of Historic Places listings in Muscatine County, Iowa

References

External links

Muscatine County website

 
Iowa placenames of Native American origin
1836 establishments in Wisconsin Territory
Populated places established in 1836
Muscatine, Iowa micropolitan area
Iowa counties on the Mississippi River